Shaftesbury Barnet Harriers are a UK athletics club based in Hendon, north west London. Their home track is Copthall Stadium.

History
Shaftesbury Barnet Harriers was founded in 1890 and amalgamated with Barnet Ladies in autumn 1986. The club qualified to enter the British Athletics League (BAL) in Division 4 in 1976, and in the space of 4 years achieved promotion to BAL Division 1 (now the Premiership).

Honours

Senior Men:
 British Athletics League
 First Place: 2012, 2013
 Second Place: 1980, 1999, 2014
 Third Place: 1983, 1989

Senior Women:

 UK Women's Athletic League
 First Place: 1997, 1999
 Second Place: 2000
 Third Place: 1996, 1998, 2002, 2006
 English National Cross Country Championships
 Winners: 1998, 1999, 2000, 2002

Notable members

Olympians

Club Kit 
The club kit is a white and black vertically striped vest or crop top with red trim, with red or black running shorts or hotpants.

See also
 Hendon

References

External links
Club Website
Barnet Copthall Stadium UK Running Track Directory
Shaftesbury Barnet Harriers Emyew Listing
 Power of 10 Club Page

Athletics clubs in London
Athletics clubs in England
Sport in the London Borough of Barnet